Juan Filloy (1 August 1894 – 15 July 2000) was an Argentine writer. At various times, he was also a swimmer and a boxing referee. He was a polyglot, speaking seven languages. Most of his life was spent in Rio Cuarto where he served as a magistrate.

Life and career
Filloy was born in Córdoba. He received many honors and awards during his lifetime, including a nomination for the Nobel Prize. He wrote 55 novels, all of which were given titles with seven letters: Op Oloop, Caterva, ¡Estafen!, Aquende, La Purga, Metopas, Periplo, Sexamor, Tal Cual and Zodíaco are among the best known. He also composed over 6,000 palindromes and coined words which have passed into general usage.

He was friends with (and influenced) Julio Cortázar and Jorge Luis Borges. He was also an acquaintance of Sigmund Freud. He died of natural causes while sleeping, shortly before his 106th birthday. He often said that he wanted to live in three centuries. His burial place is in the "Cementerio San Jerónimo" in Córdoba, Argentina.

Works in English
 Op Oloop; translated by Lisa Dillman. Dalkey Archive Press, 2009. 
 Caterva; translated by Brendan Riley. Dalkey Archive Press, 2015.

Works in Dutch
 Op Oloop; translated by Arie van der Wal. Afterword by Mempo Giardinelli. Coppens & Frenks, 1994.
 Caterva; translated by Arie van der Wal. Coppens & Frenks, 1998

Filmography
 Ecce Homo. Contrakultura, 2005. Directed by Eduardo Montes-Bradley. Film based on the last known interview with Juan Filloy by Ana Da Costa.

External links

Short story of an interview with Filloy 
Small biography and book comments

1894 births
2000 deaths
National University of Córdoba alumni
Argentine male writers
Argentine centenarians
Argentine people of Spanish descent
Argentine people of French descent
Men centenarians